The following is a list of FCC-licensed radio stations in the U.S. state of West Virginia, which can be sorted by their call signs, frequencies, cities of license, licensees, and programming formats.

List of radio stations

Defunct
 WCFC
 WCFC-FM
 WMBP-LP
 WOBG
 WPDX
 WQAB
 WQTZ-LP
 WSPW-LP
 WVBL-LP
 WVPP-LP
 WVPV-LP
 WXDB-LP

See also
 West Virginia media
 List of newspapers in West Virginia
 List of television stations in West Virginia
 Media of cities in West Virginia: Charleston, Huntington, Wheeling

References

Bibliography

External links

 
 West Virginia Broadcasters Association
 Tri-State Amateur Radio Association, Huntington, WV

Images

 
West Virginia
Radio